Ibon Begoña Zubiaur (born 17 November 1973) is a Spanish former professional footballer who played as a left-back.

Club career
Born in Bilbao, Basque Country, Begoña amassed La Liga totals of 145 games and five goals over the course of six seasons, in representation of Deportivo Alavés. He spent a total of eight years with the club in two separate spells and, in the 2000–01 campaign, contributed ten appearances in the team's runner-up run in the UEFA Cup, scoring in the 3–1 away win against Lillestrøm SK for the second round.

Other than with Alavés, Begoña played professionally in Segunda División with Bilbao Athletic and Gimnàstic de Tarragona, retiring in June 2009 at the age of 35 after two years with lowly UD Ibiza-Eivissa, with which he later worked as director of football. In late 2013, the 40-year-old returned to active with Ciudad de Ibiza CF in the Mallorca regional championships, going on to begin working as a coach also with that club.

In the summer of 2017, after Ciudad merged with UD Ibiza, a highly critical Begoña abandoned the project where he also acted as an investor.

Personal life
Begoña's younger brother, Iker, was also a footballer and a defender.

Honours
Alavés
Segunda División: 1997–98
UEFA Cup runner-up: 2000–01

References

External links

1973 births
Living people
Spanish footballers
Footballers from Bilbao
Association football defenders
La Liga players
Segunda División players
Segunda División B players
Divisiones Regionales de Fútbol players
SD Lemona footballers
Sestao Sport Club footballers
Bilbao Athletic footballers
Deportivo Alavés players
Gimnàstic de Tarragona footballers
Logroñés CF footballers
Basque Country international footballers
Spanish football managers